Lady in the Lake is an upcoming American limited series based on the novel of the same name by Laura Lippman. It is set to premiere on Apple TV+.

Premise
In 1960s Baltimore, an investigative journalist working on an unsolved murder clashes with a woman working to advance the agenda of the city's black community. The protagonist ditches her doting husband and big Pikesville home to pursue a career as a newspaper reporter. She becomes obsessed with unraveling the mystery of two separate killings: eleven-year-old Tessie Fine and a bartender named Cleo Sherwood.

Cast and characters
 Natalie Portman as Maddie Schwartz
 Moses Ingram as Cleo Sherwood
 Y'lan Noel as Ferdie Platt
 Mikey Madison as Judith Weinstein
 Brett Gelman
 Noah Jupe
 Mike Epps
 Byron Bowers
 Josiah Cross
 Pruitt Taylor Vince
 Ronnie Gene Blevins as Officer Boško
 David Corenswet
 Angela Robinson as Myrtle Summer
 Katherine Winter as Ethel Cohen

Production

Writing
The television series is based on the novel of the same name. Laura Lippman, the author, took inspiration from two real-life murders that happened in her youth. The first was the abduction and murder of 11-year-old Esther Lebowitz, a white Jewish girl whose death was heavily publicized. The second death was 33-year-old Shirley Parker, a black woman who was found dead in the fountain of the Druid Hill Park Reservoir. Parker's death was only given attention in African-American newspapers, specifically the Baltimore Afro-American.

Casting
The miniseries was given the greenlight in March 2021, with Natalie Portman and Lupita Nyong'o set to star, and Alma Har'el will direct all episodes of the series. In April 2022, Y'Lan Noel, Mikey Madison and Brett Gelman were added to the cast. In May 2022, Nyong'o exited the series. Moses Ingram would be cast to replace her in June. Noah Jupe, Mike Epps, Byron Bowers. Josiah Cross and Pruitt Taylor Vince would be added in July.

Filming
Filming began in April 2022, with production taking place in Baltimore. Production paused briefly in late August 2022, when the production received threats of violence while filming in the city. The threats were later found to be unsubstantiated after police investigation.

References

External links
 

Apple TV+ original programming
English-language television shows
Upcoming drama television series
Television shows based on American novels
Television shows filmed in Maryland